Glenwood School is a co-educational private for pupils from grades K1 through 12. The school is located in Smiths Station, Alabama in southeastern Lee County. It serves 577 students. The school is accredited by both the Alabama Independent School Association and the Southern Association of Colleges and Schools. It was founded in 1970 as a segregation academy.

History
Glenwood was founded in 1970. It was granted tax-exempt status in 1984. Glenwood Academy has been described as a segregation academy.

Be healthy
Glenwood has an obesity prevention program.

Traditions 
Glenwood has a number of traditions that have been carried on over the years. Every autumn, it holds a harvest festival and a Thanksgiving luncheon, both of which are meant to be opportunities for family members to come visit their children at the school. In the spring, the elementary school holds a field day in which athletics are the main focus. Meanwhile, year round chapel sessions are held which serve to reinforce students' moral character.

Notable alumni
Tim Hudson MLB pitcher
Lewis Colbert, punter for the Kansas City Chiefs

References 

Private schools in Alabama
Educational institutions established in 1970
Private K-12 schools in Alabama
Segregation academies in Alabama
1970 establishments in Alabama